If You're Not Part of the Solution, You're Part of the Problem is the eleventh album by American jazz tenor saxophonist Joe Henderson. It was rereleased in 2004 as At the Lighthouse, with an alternative album cover listing the personnel in place of the original title and several extra tracks. Henderson’s live band includes trumpeter Woody Shaw, keyboardist George Cables, bassist Ron McClure, tumbador Tony Waters and drummer Lenny White.

Reception 
The AllMusic review by Scott Yanow states that "this live session from the legendary Lighthouse features a particularly strong version of the Joe Henderson Quintet" and contains "excellent remakes of 'Mode for Joe' and 'Blue Bossa' ... and a fine rendition of Round Midnight'." The Penguin Guide to Jazz commented that "Henderson and Shaw play some of the leader's choicest compositions in a steaming live showcase, one of the most fondly remembered Henderson albums of the period."

Track listing

Original

Reissue

Personnel 
George Cables – electronic piano
Joe Henderson – tenor saxophone
Ron McClure – double bass, electric bass
Woody Shaw – flugelhorn, trumpet  
Tony Waters – congas 
Lenny White – drums

References 

Joe Henderson live albums
Albums produced by Orrin Keepnews
1970 live albums
Milestone Records live albums